Lueheopsis is a genus of flowering plants belonging to the family Malvaceae. It is also in the subfamily of Grewioideae.

Its native range is southern Tropical America. It is found in the countries of Bolivia, Brazil, Colombia, Ecuador, French Guiana, Guyana, Peru, Suriname and Venezuela.

The genus name of Lueheopsis is in honour of Carl Emil von der Luehe or Lühe (1751–1801), a German botanist and chamberlain of Princess Caroline-Mathilde of Denmark; later a chamberlain in Vienna, Austria. 'Opsis' refers to the Ancient Greek word ὄψις meaning aspect or appearance.
It was first described and published in Notizbl. Bot. Gart. Berlin-Dahlem Vol.9 on page 838 in 1926.  ὄψις (ópsis, “aspect", "appearance”)

Species
According to Kew:

Lueheopsis althaeiflora 
Lueheopsis burretiana 
Lueheopsis duckeana 
Lueheopsis hoehnei 
Lueheopsis rosea 
Lueheopsis rugosa

References

Grewioideae
Malvaceae genera
Plants described in 1926
Flora of Central America
Taxa named by Max Burret